Samjai Khurai-Lakpa (died 1751) was a Meitei royal. He was the son of Pamheiba and father of Bhagya Chandra. He was assassinated by his brother Chitsai in 1751 C.E.

See also
List of Meitei royals
Manipur (princely state)

External links
History of Manipur - IIT Guwahati

Meitei royalty
1751 deaths
Hindu monarchs
Year of birth unknown